Nanochannel glass materials are an experimental mask technology that is an alternate method for fabricating nanostructures, although optical lithography is the predominant patterning technique.

Nanochannel glass materials are complex glass structures containing large numbers of parallel hollow channels. In its simplest form, the hollow channels are arranged in geometric arrays with packing densities as great as 1011 channels/cm2. Channel dimensions are controllable from micrometers to tens of nanometers, while retaining excellent channel uniformity. Exact replicas of the channel glass can be made from a variety of materials. This is a low cost method for creating identical structures with nanoscale features in large numbers.

Characteristics
These materials have high density of uniform channels with diameters from 15 micrometres to 15 nanometers. These are rigid structures with serviceable temperatures to at least 300 °C, with potential up to 1000 °C. Furthermore, these are optically transparent photonic structures with high degree of reproducibility.

Applications
These can be used as a material for chromatographic columns, unidirectional conductors, Microchannel plate and nonlinear optical devices. Other uses are as masks for semiconductor development, including ion implantation, optical lithography, and reactive ion etching.

See also
E-beam lithography
Ion beam lithography
Maskless lithography
Nanolithography 
Photolithography
Porous glass
Vycor glass

References

Further reading

  "Nanochannel glass replica membranes"

Materials science
Glass
Glass engineering and science
Glass applications